The District of Monza was one of the four divisions of the , the province of Milan during the Napoleonic Italian Republic. It received the numeral III and its capital was Monza.

The district
Founded on May 13, 1801, it had a population of 78,201 inhabitants. It was composed by the communes of Monza with part of: 
 
 Brugherio
 Sant’Ambrogio e Cassina della Santa
 Agliate
 Agrate
 Aicurzio
 Albiate
 Albignano
 Arcore
 Basiano
 Belinzago
 Bellusco
 Bernareggio
 Bernate
 Biassono
 Bisentrate
 Bornago
 Burago
 Busnago
 Bussero
 Calò
 Cambiago
 Camparada
 Camporicco
 Canonica al Lambro
 Caponago
 Carate
 Carnate
 Carugate
 Casate nuovo
 Cassano sull’Adda
 Cassina Baraggia
 Cassina de’ Bracchi
 Cassina de’ Pecchi
 Cassine San Pietro
 Cavenago
 Cernusco Asinario
 Cernusco Lombardone
 Colnago
 Concesa
 Concorezzo
 Contra
 Corezzana
 Cornate
 Costa
 Gessate
 Gorgonzola
 Grezzago
 Gropello
 Incugnate
 Inzago
 Lesmo
 Lissone
 Lomagna
 Lomaniga
 Maresso
 Masate
 Melzo
 Merate
 Mezzago
 Moncucco
 Monte
 Montevecchia
 Novate
 Omate
 Oreno
 Ornago
 Osnago
 Paderno
 Paina
 Pessano
 Porto
 Pozzo
 Pozzuolo
 Robiate
 Roncello
 Ronco
 Ruginello
 San Damiano
 Sant’Agata
 Seregno
 Sovico
 Sulbiate inferiore
 Sulbiate superiore
 Trecella
 Tregasio
 Trezzano
 Trezzo
 Usmate
 Vaprio
 Vedano
 Velate
 Verderio inferiore
 Verderio superiore
 Vergo
 Villanuova
 Vimercate

Sources
 Historical database of Lombard laws (it.)

Former departments of France in Italy
History of Lombardy
Monza
Kingdom of Italy (Napoleonic)